Wang Chong (27 – c. 97 AD), courtesy name Zhongren (仲任), was a Chinese astronomer, meteorologist, naturalist, philosopher, and writer active during the Han Dynasty. He developed a rational, secular, naturalistic and mechanistic account of the world and of human beings and gave a materialistic explanation of the origin of the universe. His main work was the Lunheng (論衡, "Critical Essays"). This book contained many theories involving early sciences of astronomy and meteorology, and Wang Chong was even the first in Chinese history to mention the use of the square-pallet chain pump, which became common in irrigation and public works in China thereafter. Wang also accurately described the process of the water cycle.

Unlike most of the Chinese philosophers of his period, Wang spent much of his life in non-self-inflicted poverty. He was said to have studied by standing at bookstalls, and had a superb memory, which allowed him to become very well-versed in the Chinese classics. He eventually reached the rank of District Secretary, a post he soon lost as a result of his combative and anti-authoritarian nature.

Life 
Wang was born into a poor family in modern Shangyu, Zhejiang. Born a son of Wang Song, he was admired in his local community for his filial piety and devotion to his father. With the urging of his parents, Wang travelled to the Eastern Han capital at Luoyang to study at the Imperial University. It was there that Wang became acquainted with the prestigious historian Ban Biao (3–54), the latter who initiated the Book of Han. He also befriended Ban Gu (32–92), the son of Ban Biao who made further contributions to the Book of Han. Since he was poor and lacked enough money to purchase proper texts of study, Wang had to resort to frequent visits to bookshops to acquire knowledge. Rafe de Crespigny writes that during his studies Wang was most likely influenced by contemporary Old Text realists such as Huan Tan (d. 28). Due to his humble origins, Wang became resentful of officials who were admired simply because of their wealth and power and not for any scholarly abilities.

Wang returned to his home commandery where he became a local teacher. He was elevated as an Officer of Merit, but due to his critical and quarrelsome nature he decided to resign from this position. Following this was a period of isolated retirement when Wang composed essays on philosophy, his Jisu ("On Common Morality"), Jeiyi ("Censures"), Zheng wu ("On Government"), and Yangxing shu ("On Macrobiotics"). About eighty of these essays were later compiled into his Lunheng ("Discourses Weighed in the Balance").

Despite his self-imposed retirement, he eventually accepted an invitation of Inspector Dong Qin (fl. AD 80–90) of Yang province to work as a Headquarters Officer. However, Wang soon resigned from this post as well. Xie Yiwu, a friend of Wang Chong's and a long-standing inspector and official, made an official recommendation to the court requesting that Wang serve as a senior scholar under Emperor Zhang of Han (r. 75–88). Emperor Zhang accepted this and summoned Wang Chong to appear at his court, yet Wang claimed ill health and refused to travel. Wang later died at home around the year 100.

Although Wang's rationalistic philosophy and criticism of so-called New Text Confucianism were largely ignored during his lifetime, the prominent official and later scholar Cai Yong (132–192) wrote of his admiration for Wang's written works. The politician Wang Lang (d. 228) acquired a copy of Wang's Lunheng and brought it with him on his trip in 198 to the Han court established at Xuchang by Prime Minister Cao Cao (155–220). As some of the questionable tenets of the philosophy of New Text Confucianism fell out of use and repute, Rafe de Crespigny states that the rationalist philosophy of Wang Chong became much more influential in Chinese thought.

Work and philosophy 
Wang Chong reacted to the state that philosophy had reached in China. Daoism had long ago changed into a religious and magic way, and Confucianism had been the state religion for some 150 years. Confucius and Laozi were worshipped as gods, omens were seen everywhere, belief in ghosts was almost universal, and fengshui had begun to rule people's lives.  Wang derided all this and made a vocation of giving a rational, naturalistic account of the world and the human place in it.

At the centre of his thought was the denial that Heaven has any purpose for us, whether benevolent or hostile. To say that Heaven provides us food and clothing is to say it acts as our farmer or tailor — an obvious absurdity.  Humans are insignificant specks in the universe and cannot hope to effect changes in it, and it is ludicrous arrogance to think that the universe would change itself for us.

Wang insisted that the words of previous sages should be treated critically, and that they were often contradictory  or inconsistent. He criticized scholars of his time for not accepting this, as well as what he called the popular acceptance of written works. He believed that the truth could be discovered, and would become obvious, by making the words clear, and by clear commentary on the text.

One example of Wang's rationalism is his argument that thunder must be caused by fire or heat, and is not a sign of the heavens being displeased. He argued that repeatable experience and experiment should be tried before adopting the belief that divine will was involved.

He was equally scathing about the popular belief in ghosts.  Why should only human beings have ghosts, he asked, not other animals?  We are all living creatures, animated by the same vital principle. Besides, so many people have died that their ghosts would vastly outnumber living people; the world would be swamped by them. He never, however, explicitly denies the existence of ghosts (gui 鬼) or spirits (shen 神), he simply separates them from the notion that they are the souls of the dead. He seems to believe that the phenomena exist, but whatever they may be, they have no relation to the deceased.

People say that spirits are the souls of dead men. That being the case, spirits should always appear naked, for surely it is not contended that clothes have souls as well as men. (Lunheng)

Wang was just as rational and uncompromising about knowledge. Beliefs require evidence, just as actions require results. Anyone can prattle nonsense, and they'll always be able to find people to believe it, especially if they can dress it up in superstitious flummery. Careful reasoning and experience of the world are needed.

The Swedish linguist and sinologist Bernhard Karlgren called his style straightforward and without literary pretensions; in general, modern Western writers have noted that Wang was one of the most original thinkers of his time, even iconoclastic in his opinions. They note that he gained popularity in the early 20th century because his ideas correspond to those that later evolved in Europe. His writing is praised for being clear and well ordered. But, because there was no functioning scientific method or larger scientific discourse in his time, his formulations can seem alien to the modern eye — to some readers, even as peculiar as the superstitions that he was rejecting. But despite this barrier to his work, he gained some fame, though mostly after his death. He had an effect on what Karlgren called, the 'neo-Daoism' — a reformed Daoist philosophy with a more rational, naturalistic metaphysics, without much of the superstition and mysticism into which Daoism had fallen.

Early scientific thought

Meteorology 
With his acute rationale and objective approach, Wang Chong wrote many things that would be praised by later modern sinologists and scientists alike as being modern-minded. For example, much like Greek polymath Aristotle's 4th century BC Meteorology portrayed the water cycle, Wang Chong wrote the following passage about clouds and rain:

Wang's reference to Gongyan Gao's (i.e. Gongyan Zhuan's) commentary perhaps demonstrates that Gongyan's work, compiled in the 2nd century BC, explored the topic of the hydrological cycle long before Wang wrote about the process. The British biochemist, historian, and sinologist Joseph Needham asserts that: "As to the seasonal lunar and stellar connections, the thought of Wang Chong (about 83 AD) is that in some way or other the cyclical behavior of the qi on earth, where water is distilled into mountain clouds, is correlated with the behavior of the qi in the heavens, which brings the moon near to the Hyades at certain times." Thus, Wang Chong was uniting classical Chinese thought with radically modern ways of scientific thinking in his day.

Astronomy 
Similar to Han dynasty polymath contemporary Zhang Heng (78–139) and Chinese scholars before him, Wang discussed theories about the causation of eclipses, with solar eclipse and lunar eclipse. However, Wang Chong's theory went against the correct 'radiating influence' theory supported by Zhang Heng (that the light of the rounded moon was simply a reflection of the light emanating from the rounded sun). Writing little more than a century before Zhang Heng, the mathematician and music theorist Jing Fang (78–37 BC) wrote in the 1st century BC:

Zhang Heng wrote in his Ling Xian (Mystical Laws) of 120 AD:

Going against the grain of the accepted theory, and thinking more along the lines of the 1st century BC Roman philosopher Lucretius, Wang Chong wrote:

Although Wang Chong was certain of his ideas about eclipses (without the knowledge of how gravity forms naturally large spherical bodies in space), his ideas on this would not be later accepted in China. Although there were some figures like Liu Chi, writing in his Lun Tian (Discourse on the Heavens) of 274 AD that supported Wang's theory by arguing the inferior Yin (moon) could never obstruct the superior Yang (sun), Liu was still outside of the mainstream accepted Confucian tradition. The Song Dynasty (960-1279) polymathic scientist Shen Kuo (1031–1095) supported the old theory of a spherical sun and moon by using his own reasoning about eclipses, which he explained were due to the moon and the sun coming into obstruction of one another. The Song dynasty Chinese philosopher Zhu Xi (1130–1200) also supported this theory in his writing. Although Wang Chong was right about the water cycle and other aspects of early science, his stern opposition to mainstream Confucian thought at the time made him a skeptic of all their theories, including eclipses (the Confucian-accepted model being correct).

See also 
 Chinese philosophy
 Yigupai
 Wang Chung

Notes

References 
 de Crespigny, Rafe. (2007). A Biographical Dictionary of Later Han to the Three Kingdoms (23-220 AD). Leiden: Koninklijke Brill. .
 Needham, Joseph (1986). Science and Civilization in China: Volume 3, Mathematics and the Sciences of the Heavens and the Earth. Taipei: Caves Books Ltd.
 Needham, Joseph (1986). Science and Civilization in China: Volume 4, Physics and Physical Technology, Part 2, Mechanical Engineering. Taipei: Caves Books Ltd.
 Zhou, Wenying, "Wang Chong". Encyclopedia of China (Philosophy Edition), 1st ed.
 Zhang, Shaokang, "Wang Chong". Encyclopedia of China (Chinese Literature Edition), 1st ed.
 Xu, Qiduan, "Wang Chong". Encyclopedia of China (Physics Edition), 1st ed.

External links 
 Wang Chong entry in the Internet Encyclopedia of Philosophy
 
 Wang Ch'ung (humanistictexts.org)
 Wang Ch'ung (Peter J. King)
 
 
 Lun Hêng(论衡),works by Wang Ch'ung, PHILOSOPHICAL ESSAYS OF WANG CH'UNG,TRANSLATED FROM THE CHINESE AND ANNOTATED ALFRED FORKE

27 births
1st-century Chinese philosophers
1st-century Chinese astronomers
Chinese meteorologists
Chinese naturalists
Han dynasty essayists
Han dynasty philosophers
Han dynasty science writers
People from Shangyu
Philosophers from Zhejiang
Scientists from Shaoxing
Writers from Shaoxing
Year of death unknown